D-Side were an Irish boy band established in 2001 and signed by Clive Black atEdel Records/. Edel brought in Kim Glover to manage the band after her success with New Kids on the Block, Ant & Dec (as PJ & Duncan), B*Witched and Let Loose. A highlight for D-Side was getting a recording contract with in Japan with Avex and they worked with them until the end of 2007. They had huge success in Japan, the United Kingdom, and Europe, winning 'Best New Band Award' at the Smash Hits Tour in 2002 and scoring 3 UK Top Tens.

The group was made up of 5 members, Derek Ryan (who performed under the alias Ryan O'Rian),Derek Moran, Damien "Dane" Guiden, Shane Crevey and Damien Bowe. The band released their first single "Stronger Together" in Ireland only, which reached No. 5 on the Irish charts. The group then prepared to release their second single, "Speechless" across Europe, building on the successes in their home market. "Speechless" was released thereafter achieving three [top 10]] singles in the UK/Ireland and some around Europe. They supported Blue, Westlife and many other groups on tour during 2001 and 2002, before headlining their own live shows, as well as being involved in many charity events such as Soccer Magic, Soccer 6, Children in Need and ChildLine. In 2006, D-Side took part in the international contest "New Wave" in Urmala. They released a total of Three albums in Japan, as well as a greatest hits compilation. They were signed to the Japanese record label Avex and were managed by John Black at Black Gold Music Management. After their split in 2007, Moran went on to present Milkshake! The Number 1 Kids Tv Show in the UK  on Channel 5.

History

2001–2003: Stronger Together

Stronger Together was the title of the first album written by Red Rhythm a.k.a. Simon Britton, Cliff Randall and Tara McDonald. It was released in 2003 by Polydor UK. The album was a hit in many countries, including the UK, Ireland, Germany, France and China, reaching the top 10 in those countries. The album contained five singles. The first single, titled "Stronger Together", was released only in Ireland and reached No. 5. The second single was "Speechless", released internationally, gaining some success in Europe and Asia. The single reached the top 10 on the UK Singles Chart (#9). In the other countries, it reached the top 40. The third single was "Invisible", released in late 2003 which reached No. 7 in the UK. The song was also a hit in Europe and Asia, reaching the top 5 in countries such as China, Ireland and France. The song was later covered by Clay Aiken. The fourth single, "Real World", was released in February 2004. It reached No. 4 in Ireland and No. 9 in the UK. The fifth and final single was "Pushin' Me Out", released in April 2004. It reached No. 21 in the UK.

2004–2006: Gravity and Unbroken

Gravity was the second album from the group, released by Avex/Polydor. The group had become a trio by this time. The album peaked at No. 10 in China, but generated less interest elsewhere, only reaching No. 20 in Ireland, and landing within the top 40 in France and Germany. The album contained three singles, but only one was released in Europe. "One More Night Alone" missed the top 40 in France and Germany, and in China peaked at No. 27. The next single was "Sacrifice", a pop-ballad duet with Antony Costa, which was released only in Japan and China. It reached No. 1 on the Chinese charts. The third single, "Who Wants the World", was only released in Japan.

Their third and final album, Unbroken, was released on 28 October 2006. "No One" is an unreleased track written by Bryan Adams.

Discography

Studio albums

Compilation albums

DVDs

Singles

References

External links 
 Japanese Official Website

Avex Group artists
Irish boy bands
Musical groups established in 2001
Musical groups disestablished in 2008
Musical quintets
Polydor Records artists